The Fellowship of Saint Alban and Saint Sergius is a Christian ecumenical society founded in 1928 to foster contact between Christians, especially those of the Anglican and Orthodox traditions. It is named in honour of Saint Alban, the Christian protomartyr of Britain, and Saint Sergius of Radonezh, a patron saint of Russia. It publishes the periodical Sobornost, edited for 30 years by Sergei Hackel, and arranges an annual conference. Its headquarters are currently at Oxford in Britain, and it has branches elsewhere in Britain and in Bulgaria, Denmark, Greece, Romania, Russia and Sweden. There have also been sporadic activities in Canada and the United States.

The Fellowship's patrons are Archbishop Nikitas of Thyateira and Great Britain, Archbishop Job of Telmessos, Archbishop Angaelos of London, Metropolitan Kallistos of Diokleia, Bishop Matthew of Sourozh, the Right Reverend Dr. Richard Chartres, Lord Williams of Oystermouth, and Dr. Sebastian Brock, FBA.

Nicholas Zernov and his wife Militza wrote The Fellowship of St Alban and St Sergius: a Historical Memoir in 1979 to commemorate the 50th anniversary of the fellowship.

Literature
 Bryn Geffert, Eastern Orthodox and Anglicans: Diplomacy, Theology, and the Politics of Interwar Ecumenism Notre Dame, Indiana: University of Notre Dame Press, 2010. 
 Dimitrios Filippos Salapatas, The Fellowship of St Alban and St Sergius: Orthodox and Anglican Ecumenical Relations 1927–2012. Cambridge: Cambridge Scholars Publishing, 2018. . Foreword by Rowan Williams
 Nicolas and Militza Zernov, The Fellowship of St Alban and St Sergius: A historical Memoir, Oxford 1979

See also

 Anglican and Eastern Churches Association
 Anthony of Sourozh
 John Albert Douglas
 Sergei Bulgakov

External links
 

Anglican ecumenism
Christian ecumenical organizations
Eastern Orthodox organizations established in the 20th century
Christian organizations established in 1928